The Dye Water is a river in the Lammermuir Hills in the Scottish Borders area of Scotland. It rises in the Hope Hills, continues along the East Lothian boundary, a mile north east of Seenes Law, then east to Longformacus. The Dye Water joins the Whiteadder Water and completes its 12.5 mile journey.

The Sir Walter Scott Way and the Southern Upland Way long distance footpaths also pass through Longformacus.

See also
List of places in the Scottish Borders
List of places in Scotland

External links 

 CANMORE/RCAHMS record of Dye Water - (RCAHMS - the Royal Commission on the Ancient and Historical Monuments of Scotland

Rivers of the Scottish Borders
2Dye